Pool A of the 2016 Fed Cup Asia/Oceania Zone Group I was one of two pools in the Asia/Oceania zone of the 2016 Fed Cup. Four teams competed in a round robin competition, with the top team and the bottom team proceeding to their respective sections of the play-offs: the top team played for advancement to the World Group II Play-offs, while the bottom team faced potential relegation to Group II.

Standings

Round-robin

Japan vs. Uzbekistan

Thailand vs. India

Thailand vs. Uzbekistan

Japan vs. India

Thailand vs. Japan

Uzbekistan vs. India

References

External links 
 Fed Cup website

2016 Fed Cup Asia/Oceania Zone